Carteret (earlier, de Carteret) is a surname of Norman origin. The Channel Islands are the only remnant of the Duchy of Normandy, the original territorial holding of William the Conqueror, who invaded England in 1066. Historically, members of the Carteret family have occupied influential positions in the Channel Islands, notably as hereditary Seigneurs of Sark and hereditary Bailiffs of Jersey.

Carteret as a surname 
 Anna Carteret (born 1942), British stage and screen actress
 Sir Charles Carteret, 3rd Baronet (1679-1715), Seigneur of Sark 1693-1715
 Edward Carteret (1671–1739), English politician
 Elias de Carteret, father of George Carteret
 Elizabeth Carteret (1664/651717), wife of Philip Carteret FRS, mother of Sir Charles Carteret 
 George Carteret, 1st Baronet ( – 1680), one of the first proprietors of New Jersey 
 George Carteret, 1st Baron Carteret (first creation) (1667–95), ennobled 1681 in recognition of the loyalty of his grandfather, George Carteret, to the Crown
 George Thynne, 2nd Baron Carteret (second creation) (1770-1838), British Tory politician, nephew of Henry Carteret, 1st Baron Carteret
 George de Carteret (1886-1932), Anglican Bishop of Jamaica 1916-31
 George William de Carteret (AKA Le Caouain, 1869–1940), Norman language journalist and writer from Jersey
 Godefroy De Carteret, Anglo-French nobleman, son of Renaud De Carteret III
 Hellier de Carteret, Seigneur of Sark
 Henry Carteret, 1st Baron Carteret (second creation) (1735–1826), British politician, Bailiff of Jersey 1776–1826, uncle of George Thynne, 2nd Baron Carteret
 Jason De Carteret (active from 2011), British polar explorer born on Guernsey
 John Carteret, 2nd Earl Granville (Baron Carteret, first creation) (1690–1763), British statesman and Secretary of State, Seigneur of Sark 1715-20 
 Carteret Ministry, the executive arm of the British government 1742–44, named after John Carteret, 2nd Earl Granville
 John Thynne, 3rd Baron Carteret (second creation) (1772-1849), British peer and politician.
 Nicolas Henri Carteret (1807–62), French lawyer and politician
 Peter Carteret (1641after 1672), Governor of the British colony of Albemarle (later to become North Carolina) 1670-72
 Philip Carteret FRS (1641–72), son of George Carteret, father of George Carteret, 1st Baron Carteret (first creation)
 Philip De Carteret, 8th Seigneur of St Ouen (before 14701500), English or French nobleman
 Sir Philip Carteret, 1st Baronet (1620-1663/75), Seigneur of Sark
 Philip Carteret (colonial governor) (1639–82), first Governor of New Jersey
 Sir Philip Carteret, 2nd Baronet (–93), Seigneur of Sark 1663-93
 Philip Carteret (1733–96), British naval officer and explorer
 Philippe De Carteret, 2nd of St Ouen (born 1152), Anglo-French nobleman
 Philippe De Carteret, 3rd of St Ouen, Anglo-French nobleman, son of Philippe De Carteret, 2nd of St Ouen
 Philippe de Carteret I (1552–94), Seigneur of Sark 1578-94
 Philippe de Carteret II (1584-1643), Seigneur of Sark
 Renaud De Carteret I (1063–1125), Anglo-French nobleman
 Renaud de Carteret II, Anglo-French nobleman, father of Philippe De Carteret, 2nd of St Ouen and of Renaud De Carteret III
 Renaud De Carteret III (1140–1214), Anglo-French nobleman, son of Renaud de Carteret II
 Renaud De Carteret V (born 1316), Anglo-French nobleman

Carteret as a given name 
 Frederick de Carteret Malet (1837-1912), Jersey-born influential person in New Zealand
 John Carteret Pilkington (1730–63), Irish singer and writer
 Philip Carteret Hill (1821–94), Canadian politician in Nova Scotia
 Philip Carteret Silvester (1777–1828), British naval officer, son of Philip Carteret
 Philip Carteret Webb (1702–70), English barrister and antiquarian

See also 
 Baron Carteret, firstly a Peerage of England; secondly and independently a Peerage of Great Britain
 Carteret baronets, two extinct baronetcies in the Baronetage of England
 De Carteret family
 List of Seigneurs of Sark
 Carteret (disambiguation)

References 
Notes

Sources
 

Surnames of Norman origin